Burcu Yüksel (née Ayhan; ; born 3 May 1990 in Kadirli, Osmaniye Province) is a Turkish female high jumper. She is a member of Fenerbahçe Athletics club, where she is coached by Cüneyt Yüksel.

Biography
She earned the gold medal at the 2007 Black Sea Games and the silver medal at the 2009 Mediterranean Games. Ayhan was the bronze medalist at the 2009 European Athletics Junior Championships held in Novi Sad, Serbia. She became gold medalist at the 64th Balkan Championships held in Sliven, Bulgaria. At the 2011 European U23 Championships held in Ostrava, Czech Republic, she jumped 1.94 m high breaking new national record, and earned the bronze medal.

She participated at the 2012 Summer Olympics.

She won a gold medal at the 3rd Islamic Solidarity Games in Palembang, Indonesia.

Achievements

References

External links
 

1990 births
Living people
Turkish female high jumpers
Fenerbahçe athletes
People from Kadirli
Olympic athletes of Turkey
Athletes (track and field) at the 2012 Summer Olympics
Mediterranean Games gold medalists for Turkey
Mediterranean Games silver medalists for Turkey
Athletes (track and field) at the 2009 Mediterranean Games
Athletes (track and field) at the 2013 Mediterranean Games
Mediterranean Games medalists in athletics
Islamic Solidarity Games competitors for Turkey